The Nelson Mandela Regiment (formerly Regiment Piet Retief)  is a reserve infantry regiment of the South African Army.

History

Under the Union Defence Force

World War 2 Mobilisation
The regiment was founded on 1 February 1940 as a citizen force infantry unit and named the Regiment Piet Retief, with the main purpose to supply troops for the Second World War.  On 16 March 1940, the regiment was reorganized as an artillery unit renamed the 5th Field Regiment, South African Artillery taking part in the Second World War as such.

Post World War
After the Second World War, the 5th Field became virtually non existent, however some years later the remnants of the regiment was renamed to Regiment Algoa Bay, of which its Uitenhage company became known as Regiment Uitenhage at a later stage.

Rebirth of Regiment Piet Retief
On 1 January 1954, Regiment Piet Retief was re-established as a predominantly Afrikaans speaking motorized infantry citizen force regiment with its headquarters in Graaff-Reinet.  In 1956 the HQ moved to Cradock and in 1962 it moved to the Drill Hall in Queenstown.  During 1987 the HQ moved to Port Elizabeth, where it is still based.

Under the SADF

Numerous Name changes
In 1960 the regiment's name was changed to Regiment Transkei (RTK), but by 1966, this was changed to Regiment Noordoos-Kaap (RNOK) and by 1 April 1967 the name was again changed back to Regiment Piet Retief (RPR).

Colours
On 22 November 1969, the regiment received its Regimental Colours and changed its role to that of an infantry CO.IN(counter insurgency) unit.

On 19 May 1990 the unit received its National Colour, which was laid up at the Group 39 chapel in Queenstown in 1995.

Under the SANDF

Command
On 11 November 1994, the regiment was placed under command of Group 39 in Queenstown, after being under command of Group 6 in Port Elizabeth for a number of years.

On 1 April 1997 the regiment was again placed under command of Group 6, after the closure of Group 39.

Amalgamation
During the latter part of 2000, Regiment Algoa Bay, Regiment Uitenhage and Donkin Regiment were amalgamated with Regiment Piet Retief.  A new command team was appointed by the Infantry Formation.  Regiment Piet Retief was then placed directly under command of the Infantry Formation.

Name change
In August 2019, 52 Reserve Force units had their names changed to reflect the diverse military history of South Africa. Regiment Piet Retief became the Nelson Mandela Regiment (in memory of the late President of South Africa), and have 3 years to design and implement new regimental insignia.

Current Command
Honorary Colonel:  Col Mzwandile B. Vena
Officer Commanding:  Lt Col Vusumzi Mbali
Second in Command:  Maj Sizwe Morgan Singunza
RSM:  MWO Alfred Melubakho Xokolo

Leadership

Regimental emblems

Badge
The regiments emblem depicts an Aloe (Aloe Ferox) in bloom with the motto "AD MORTEM" (till death) on the scroll beneath it.  Ferox is a Latin adjective meaning brave, courageous and combative, which is a fitting to an aloe, due to the difficult circumstances under which it normally has to grow and fitting to true infantrymen, due to the difficult circumstances under which they sometimes have to operate.

Dress
The regiment's leader group used to wear their infantry lanyards around the right shoulder with dress number 1 and 4, because of the regiments historical connection with the artillery, namely the 5th Field Regiment. The current leadership felt its necessary to align itself with the current dress code and regulations and changed the lanyard to the left as the rest of the Infantry Formation.

The regiment has its own unique mess dress with an orange jacket, depicting the colour of the flowers of its emblem, as well as the regiment's strong roots in the Eastern Cape, where orange is a traditional colour used widely by many of the Xhosa tribes.

The regiment also has its own blue blazer with an aloe in full colour on the pocket badge for all unit members. A silver aloe is used on the pocket badge for those regiment members with John Chard Medals (for 10 years long service), loyal service medals and Gold for members with JCD and 20 years in service.

The regiment also has an informal attire consisting of a golf shirt, padded jacket, jersey, shorts, cap and track suit all with the regiment's emblem on it.

Toast
The regiment toasts with aloe juice.  When members are promoted, they are congratulated to their new rank or appointment by being expected to have a drink of aloe juice, after which they say the unit motto "AD MORTEM" aloud.

Battle cry
In order to motivate the regiments soldiers as Infanteers, the regiment has its own unique "Battle Cry" that also promotes the regiments and Infantry ethos.

Song
The regiment encouraged members to compose a song that would identify them and their uniqueness from the Eastern Cape, including the long road the regiment has travelled in protecting the countries citizens as a force multiplier to the Regular Force.

Regimental Symbols
The units emblem is the tough Aloe plant, for which the Eastern Cape is known.

Previous Dress Insignia

Current Dress Insignia

References 

Infantry regiments of South Africa
Military units and formations in Port Elizabeth
Military units and formations established in 1964
Military units and formations disestablished in 1997